Cascade Charter Township is a charter township of Kent County in the U.S. state of Michigan. The population was 17,134 at the 2010 census.

The township is part of the Grand Rapids metropolitan area and is located just east of the city of Grand Rapids.  The township is the location of Gerald R. Ford International Airport.

Communities
 Cascade is an unincorporated community within the township at the intersection of 28th Street and Cascade Road.  Cascade was initially platted in 1845 by D. S. T. Weller. It had a post office from 1854 until 1910.
 Forest Hills is an unincorporated community and census-designated place that occupies the northern half of the township.  The CDP consists of  (51.09%) of the township's area and 12,917 township residents (75.39%) at the 2010 census. Forest Hills is organized for statistical purposes only and also contains a large area of Ada Township to the north.  It is the largest CDP in the state of Michigan in both area and population.

History
The township was originally a part of Ada Township and was separately organized in 1848.

The Whitney Tavern Stand is located within the township.  It was built in 1853 and is listed on the National Register of Historic Places.

Geography

A defining feature of the township is the Thornapple River, which divides the township into east and west halves. The township is bordered to the west by the city of Kentwood, to the north by Ada Township, to the east by Lowell Charter Township, and to the south by Caledonia Charter Township.

Transportation

Airport
  Gerald R. Ford International Airport is a commercial airport that occupies  of the southwestern portion of the township.

Major highways
  runs east–west through the center of the township.
  enters at the southern portion of the township and has its eastern terminus at I-96.
  enters briefly at the southwestern corner of the township.

Education
The township is served by three public school districts.  Caledonia Community Schools serves the southern portion of the township.  Most of the township is served by Forest Hills Public Schools, and Lowell Area Schools serves a small eastern portion of the township.

West Michigan Aviation Academy is a charter high school located within the township.

Demographics
As of the census of 2000, there were 15,107 people, 5,394 households, and 4,374 families residing in the township. The racial makeup of the township was 94.55% White, 1.00% African American, 0.28% Native American, 3.06% Asian, 0.26% from other races, and 0.85% from two or more races. Hispanic or Latino of any race were 0.87% of the population.

There were 5,394 households, out of which 39.3% had children under the age of 18 living with them, 75.1% were married couples living together, 4.5% had a female householder with no husband present, and 18.9% were non-families. 16.7% of all households were made up of individuals, and 8.0% had someone living alone who was 65 years of age or older.  The average household size was 2.80 and the average family size was 3.16.

In the township the population was spread out, with 29.4% under the age of 18, 4.7% from 18 to 24, 23.8% from 25 to 44, 30.8% from 45 to 64, and 11.4% who were 65 years of age or older.  The median age was 41 years. For every 100 females, there were 98.4 males.  For every 100 females age 18 and over, there were 94.8 males.

The median income for a household in the township was $87,290, and the median income for a family was $98,013. Males had a median income of $71,960 versus $37,234 for females. The per capita income for the township was $39,470.  About 1.5% of families and 2.3% of the population were below the poverty line, including 2.3% of those under age 18 and 3.4% of those age 65 or over.

Notable people

References

External links

Cascade Township official website

Townships in Kent County, Michigan
Charter townships in Michigan
Grand Rapids metropolitan area
Populated places established in 1848
1848 establishments in Michigan